Goole is a town located in the East Riding of Yorkshire, UK.

Goole may also refer to:
 Brigg and Goole, a constituency represented in the Parliament of the United Kingdom
 Goole Rural District, defunct rural district in the West Riding of Yorkshire, UK
 Goole Fields, a civil parish in the East Riding of Yorkshire, UK
 Goole (UK Parliament constituency), defunct constituency
 Goole (rugby league), a club in the Yorkshire town
HMS Goole (1918), first world war minesweeper
 A character in J. B. Priestley's play An Inspector Calls

See also
 Gool (disambiguation)